The EMD E5 is a , A1A-A1A passenger train-hauling diesel locomotive manufactured by Electro-Motive Corporation, and its corporate successor, General Motors' Electro-Motive Division (EMD) of La Grange, Illinois, and produced exclusively for the Chicago, Burlington and Quincy Railroad (“The Burlington Route”), and its subsidiaries, during 1940 and 1941. The E5 was distinguished from the otherwise very similar E3, E4 and E6 by being clad in polished stainless steel to match the Burlington's Zephyr trains. It also featured unique small grill-like ornamentation on both sides of the upper headlight. Like the other models in the E-series, the E5 had a sloping “slant nose” and it was equipped with two headlights — a regular stationary headlight above a gyrating Mars signal light. The E5 was the sixth in the EMD E-unit series.

Engine and powertrain
Designed specifically for railroad locomotives, this supercharged 2 stroke 45 degree V type, with an  bore by  stroke giving  displacement per cylinder, remained in production until 1966. Two D.C. generators, one per engine, provide power to four motors, two on each truck, in an A1A-A1A arrangement. This truck design was used on all E units and on MP 7100 AA6, CB&Q 9908, and CRI&P AB6 power cars. EMC/EMD has built all of its major components since 1939.

Original owners

Locomotive details

Surviving example 
Only one E5 unit of the original 16 built survives today. The last surviving EMD E5 diesel, CB&Q No. 9911A Silver Pilot, is owned and operated by the Illinois Railway Museum in Union, Illinois. Last used on the Fort Worth and Denver Railway (a CB&Q subsidiary) on the Texas Zephyr, the E5 is matched with one of the Burlington's Nebraska Zephyrs, a 5 car, articulated, stainless steel 1936 passenger train. This equipment was used in the production of the 1992 film A League of Their Own, and for the 2006 film Flags of Our Fathers, E5 9911A Silver Pilot was used with 4 stainless steel passenger cars relettered to resemble the Zephyr trainset. 9911 is equipped with dual horns, which is a WABCO E2 and a Leslie Controls RS2M.

See also 

List of GM-EMD locomotives

References

Notes

Bibliography

External links 

 IRM Roster: Chicago Burlington & Quincy 9911A
 Burlington Route Historical Society, Rosters, Equipment & Structures

Diesel-electric locomotives of the United States
A1A-A1A locomotives
E5
Chicago, Burlington and Quincy Railroad
Passenger locomotives
Railway locomotives introduced in 1940
Locomotives with cabless variants
Standard gauge locomotives of the United States
Streamlined diesel locomotives
Chicago, Burlington and Quincy locomotives